Mark Davitt (born 1952) is a former Iowa State Representative from the 74th District. He has served in the Iowa House of Representatives from 2003 to 2009.

Davitt was re-elected in 2006 with 5,802 votes (52%), defeating Republican opponent Doug Shull. He was defeated for re-election in 2008, losing to Republican Kent Sorenson.

Davitt was a candidate in the special election for the seat in the Iowa Senate resigned by Sorenson in 2013.

Early life and education
Davitt was born in Winterset, Iowa and was raised working on his parents farm.

Career
He is also a small business owner. He owns and operates Davitt Photo Alliance, which specialized is commercial photography. Davitt, a Democrat, served six years in the Iowa House.

Organizations
He is a member of the following organizations:
St. Thomas Aquinas Catholic Church in Indianola
Knights of Columbus 
Indianola Lions Club
Elected member of the Warren County Extension Council 
Past member of Warren County Farm Bureau

Family
Davitt is the son of Phil and Theo. He is married to his wife Amy Duncan and together they have two children, Elizabeth and Duncan.

References

External links
 

Democratic Party members of the Iowa House of Representatives
Living people
People from Winterset, Iowa
Place of birth missing (living people)
People from Indianola, Iowa
1952 births